Silas Muriuki Ruteere (born 12 January 1949) is a Kenyan politician who was a member of the National Assembly of Kenya. Muriuki was the sole representative of the Mazingira Green Party of Kenya and represented the North Imenti constituency.

Prior to becoming a member of parliament Muriuki worked as a teacher and was the head teacher of a school for the deaf.

References

1949 births
Living people
Members of the National Assembly (Kenya)